James Earl "Boobie" Miles Jr. (born April 16, 1970) is a former high school football running back for Permian High School, and was a primary subject in the book Friday Night Lights: A Town, a Team, and a Dream by H.G. Bissinger, and the movie inspired by the book. He attended Permian High School in Odessa, Texas.

Miles is a major figure in Bissinger's book as one of the top high school runningbacks in Texas. He was sought by dozens of top college football schools, but his promising career was derailed by a knee injury.

Early life
Miles was born en route to St. Luke's Hospital in Houston with a police escort on April 16, 1970. He lived with his parents until he was three when his mother left him with his maternal grandmother in Houston and moved permanently to Oklahoma without him. Around the age of five Miles went to live with his father, James Sr. The elder Miles was working two jobs, as a truck driver and printing-plant labourer. His father lost custody of Boobie when he started dating a woman who, Boobie says, physically abused him. He was placed in a foster home in the Houston area, and eight months later he was put in the care of his uncle L.V. Miles in Odessa, Texas. The two shared the house with L.V.'s wife, Ruby, and her three daughters.

Miles started playing football for the Vikings, a Pop Warner football team that L.V. coached.

High school football career
In 1987, Miles rushed for 1,345 yards. Expectations were high every year at Permian High School and in 1988 the Associated Press, in its preseason predictions, had chosen Permian to win the state title based partly on the play of Miles. From the spring through the early fall of '88, Miles was heavily recruited by numerous top football schools. Letters came from Notre Dame, Florida State University, University of Nebraska, University of Houston, Texas A&M, Clemson University, Texas Tech, University of Oklahoma, Oklahoma State, Louisiana State University (LSU), Southern Methodist University (SMU), University of Southern California (USC), Purdue University, and University of Arkansas.

However, in a preseason scrimmage against the Amarillo Palo Duro Dons, Miles' leg was caught in the artificial turf when he planted his left leg to stiff-arm a tackler; another player then fell on it from the side. The next day he was examined by a local doctor. The initial diagnosis of the injury was that it was only a sprained ligament. Four days later an orthopedic surgeon, Dr. Dean, examined Miles and felt the injury was severe enough to require arthroscopic surgery. The surgery was performed the day before Permian's season opener against Austin High School. Miles had severely torn the anterior cruciate ligament. He had also torn the cartilage in his left knee. Miles was given the option of immediate reconstructive surgery, which Dean had recommended, or a program of rehabilitation. Rehab would allow Miles to play football with a knee brace. Both Boobie and L.V. opted for the brace.

Miles returned against Abilene High School, however left the game limping with a cramp after only a handful of carries. The next week against Midland Lee High School, Permian lost, with Miles threatening to quit the team at halftime for his lack of playing time. Miles quit the team that Monday, and in November 1988 Dean performed reconstructive surgery on his knee. After rehabilitation from the surgery Miles lost much of the speed that had made him an effective fullback.

After his injury Miles was the target of racial epithets and was told he "should be shot like an animal" after being injured. After a fight with L.V., Miles moved out and with Chris Comer taking his place at fullback, Miles did not play for Permian High School again.

Friday Night Lights
Miles was a key figure in Friday Night Lights: A Town, a Team, and a Dream, a 1990 book by H. G. Bissinger that followed the story of the 1988 Permian High Panthers football team as they made a run towards the Texas state championship. In 2002, Sports Illustrated named Friday Night Lights the fourth-greatest book ever written about sports.

A movie version of Friday Night Lights was made and then released in the United States on October 6, 2004. It starred Billy Bob Thornton as Permian Coach Gary Gaines. The film was a box office and critical success and, in turn, spawned an NBC television series of the same name, which began airing in October 2006. Boobie was played by Derek Luke.

After high school
Miles attended Ranger College for a year. He then spent some time playing semi-pro football in Culpeper, Virginia. He has said he regrets trying to play on his injured knee before having surgery to repair it.

He has four children who live in Midland with their mother. As of June 2018, Miles lives in Coppers Cove, Texas with his wife, Becca, and is working for Jack Welch Recruiting. In May 2011, he was charged with aggravated assault. Police said he struck his stepbrother repeatedly in the head with a beer bottle. He received a sentence of five years' deferred probation in district court. He was picked up on a probation violation and served five years in prison. Miles was released in January 2018. 

In 2012, Buzz Bissinger published a 34-page afterword called After Friday Night Lights, which has Bissinger visiting with Miles and discussing their 25-year friendship.

Popular culture
In 2010, southern hip hop rapper/producer Big K.R.I.T. released a song entitled "Hometown Hero" on his mixtape Krit Wuz Here, in which he features Boobie Miles quotes from the movie Friday Night Lights. Big K.R.I.T., also released a song entitled "Boobie Miles" on his 2012 mixtape 4eva Na Day. In 2021, Brockhampton member Matt Champion references Miles on the song "What's the Occasion?" 

Miles is related to Buffalo Bills linebacker Von Miller.

Anthony Dixon, a former running back and special-teamer for the Buffalo Bills, is nicknamed "Boobie" in reference to Miles.

Miles Sanders, a current running back for the Carolina Panthers, is also nicknamed "Boobie" in reference to Miles.

Quavo, member of hip hop trio Migos, references Miles in the song "Bad and Boujee" with the line "Run with that sack, call me Boobie".

References

1970 births
Living people
Ranger Rangers football players
People from Odessa, Texas
Permian High School alumni
Players of American football from Houston